Clinton Young (born 16 February 1986) is an Australian rules football coach and former player who is currently an assistant coach with the Box Hill Hawks Football Club in the Victorian Football League. As a player, he played with the Hawthorn Football Club and Collingwood Football Club in the Australian Football League. Young is widely considered to be one of the best left foot kicks on the run in the AFL, often kicking in excess of 50 metres.

Hawthorn

He was recruited from Minyip-Murtoa and North Ballarat U18's. Young started the 2005 season on the rookie list, he was promoted to the senior list later that year. Young made his debut at AFL level in Round 16, 2005 for the Hawthorn Football Club. He finished the season with seven games of experience where he showed a lot of potential. In 2006 he played the first 7 games of the season, his performance was reasonably consistent during this period. After being out of the side several weeks, Young made a return in Round 12 against Richmond at Aurora Stadium in Launceston. This was to be his best game for the season as he recorded then career highs of 21 kicks, 24 disposals and 13 marks as his team defeated Richmond comfortably. His 13 marks was equal best on his team.

Young can play on the wing or up forward. His speed and ball skills make him a good wingman whilst his height and kicking ability make him a versatile forward.

He played an important role in the Hawks 2008 Grand Final victory over Geelong where he was the Hawks leading possession getter in the first half before succumbing to an ankle injury early in the third quarter.

Young missed most of the 2009 season with a hip injury. After a lean couple of seasons, in 2012 Young was able to maintain his spot in the Hawthorn team. His last game for the club was in the 2012 AFL Grand Final.

Collingwood
Young became a Collingwood player after leaving the Hawks as an unrestricted free agent. It was the opportunity to play a key role on the wing at Collingwood that saw Young make his decision, he has signed a three-year contract.
His first season with the Magpies was ruined by injury. He managed two games in an injury interrupted year. In his second season at Collingwood Young has not lived up to his expectation. He has been up and down and towards the end of the season was playing in the VFL. Young was delisted by Collingwood In September 2015, and announced his official retirement on 29 October.

Post-AFL
After concluding his AFL career, Young played for Gisborne in the Bendigo Football League. He was appointed the club’s coach at the start of 2018.

Statistics

|- style=background:#EAEAEA
| 2005 ||  || 45
| 7 || 4 || 2 || 44 || 14 || 58 || 23 || 16 || 0.6 || 0.3 || 6.3 || 2.0 || 8.3 || 3.3 || 2.3 || 0
|-
| 2006 ||  || 45
| 14 || 1 || 4 || 141 || 39 || 180 || 84 || 26 || 0.1 || 0.3 || 10.1 || 2.8 || 12.9 || 6.0 || 1.9 || 0
|- style=background:#EAEAEA
| 2007 ||  || 45
| 23 || 8 || 11 || 303 || 145 || 448 || 166 || 58 || 0.3 || 0.5 || 13.2 || 6.3 || 19.5 || 7.2 || 2.5 || 2
|-
| bgcolor=F0E68C | 2008# ||  || 11
| 20 || 14 || 6 || 251 || 104 || 355 || 172 || 48 || 0.7 || 0.3 || 12.6 || 5.2 || 17.8 || 8.6 || 2.4 || 3
|- style=background:#EAEAEA
| 2009 ||  || 11
| 5 || 0 || 4 || 39 || 32 || 71 || 23 || 22 || 0.0 || 0.8 || 7.8 || 6.4 || 14.2 || 4.6 || 4.4 || 0
|-
| 2010 ||  || 11
| 17 || 15 || 10 || 152 || 67 || 219 || 68 || 57 || 0.9 || 0.6 || 8.9 || 3.9 || 12.9 || 4.0 || 3.4 || 0
|- style=background:#EAEAEA
| 2011 ||  || 11
| 10 || 5 || 10 || 110 || 42 || 152 || 51 || 14 || 0.5 || 1.0 || 11.0 || 4.2 || 15.2 || 5.1 || 1.4 || 0
|-
| 2012 ||  || 11
| 20 || 13 || 16 || 267 || 92 || 359 || 98 || 64 || 0.7 || 0.8 || 13.4 || 4.6 || 18.0 || 4.9 || 3.2 || 3
|- style=background:#EAEAEA
| 2013 ||  || 14
| 2 || 0 || 0 || 17 || 12 || 29 || 8 || 3 || 0.0 || 0.0 || 8.5 || 6.0 || 14.5 || 4.0 || 1.5 || 0
|-
| 2014 ||  || 14
| 19 || 9 || 8 || 210 || 95 || 305 || 99 || 52 || 0.5 || 0.4 || 11.7 || 5.3 || 16.9 || 5.5 || 2.9 || 1
|- style=background:#EAEAEA
| 2015 ||  || 14
| 0 || — || — || — || — || — || — || — || — || — || — || — || — || — || — || 0
|- class="sortbottom"
! colspan=3| Career
! 137 !! 69 !! 71 !! 1534 !! 642 !! 2176 !! 792 !! 360 !! 0.5 !! 0.5 !! 11.3 !! 4.7 !! 16.0 !! 5.8 !! 2.6 !! 9
|}

Honours and achievements
Team
 AFL premiership player: 2008
 Minor premiership: 2012

Individual
 AFL Rising Star nominee: 2006

Family
His cousin, Ross Young, is the current captain of the Richmond reserves team in the Victorian Football League.

References

External links

Collingwood Football Club players
Hawthorn Football Club players
Hawthorn Football Club Premiership players
1986 births
Living people
Australian rules footballers from Victoria (Australia)
Greater Western Victoria Rebels players
Box Hill Football Club players
People educated at St Patrick's College, Ballarat
One-time VFL/AFL Premiership players